Interactivo is a collaborative group of Cuban musicians, led by the pianist, singer and composer Roberto Carcasses. As an acknowledgement of their growing notoriety, the band has recently been the subject of a documentary directed by Tane Martinez, and premiered at the Havana International Film Festival in December 2010.

History 

Interactivo is a music collective begun by Roberto Carcasses in Havana, Cuba around a core group of five musicians : Roberto Carcasses, Yusa, Francis de Rio, William Vicanco and Telmary Diaz.  Credited as being the « director » of the group rather than the leader, Roberto Carcasses prides himself on Interactivo's free-form, experimental, and collaborative nature.  Over the years, new members have joined the band, including Olivier Valdes, Rodney Barreto, Yaroldi Abreu, Carlos Rios, Raul Verdecia, Julio Padron, Carlos Miyares, David Suarez, Alexey Barroso, Juan Carlos Marin, Brenda Navarrete, Marjorie Rivera and Lisset Ochoa, among others.

The frequent line-up changes and comings and goings of its members has made Interactivo utterly indescribable and unable to be pinned under one musical genre. Traditional Afro-Cuban beats mingle with jazz, soul, rap, and funk music which highlights the individual musicians' strengths as well as the group's success at collaboration.

The release of their newest album, Cubanos por el Mundo, has launched a world tour. Numerous other renowned artists took part in the recording sessions, among them : singer and chekeré player Oscar Valdés, vocalist Bobby Carcassés, bassists Carlos Ríos, Feliciano Arango and Néstor del Prado, drummers Adel González, Rodney Yllarza Barreto and Oliver Valdés ; guitarists Elmer Ferrer and José Luis Martínez ; trumpetists Julio Padrón, Carlos Sarduy, Carlos M. Miyares and David Suárez ; vocalists and chorists Marjorie Rivera, Melvis Santa, Santiago Feliú, Descemer Bueno, David Torrens, and Kelvis Ochoa.

Awards 

 2006 Cubadisco Award for Goza Pepilla

Discography 
 2005 Goza Pepillo
 2010 Cubanos por el mundo

See also 
 Roberto Carcasses
 Telmary Diaz
 Yusa
 Kelvis Ochoa
 Descemer Bueno

References 
 http://www.havana-cultura.com
 http://www.cubaheadlines.com/2011/04/09/30617/havana_film_festival_in_new_york.html
 https://web.archive.org/web/20120421202511/http://www.juventudrebelde.co.cu/culture/2010-03-01/interactivo-cd-launch-concert-on-saturday

External links 
 http://en.cubafiesta.net/news/cuba-news-interactivo-cd-launch-concert-in-havana
 http://bimhuis.com/gigs/interactivo
 http://www.filmfestivaltoday.com/press-releases/individual-tickets-now-on-sale-plus-contenders-for-the-havana-star-prize-for-best-documentary

Cuban musical groups